Lovemore Mokgweetsi (born 9 October 1974) is a Botswana footballer who plays as a defender for TAFIC. He played for the Botswana national football team in 2000, including a 1-0 loss to Zambia in World Cup qualifying on 22 April 2000.

References

External links
 

Association football defenders
Botswana footballers
Botswana international footballers
1974 births
Living people
Mochudi Centre Chiefs SC players
TAFIC F.C. players